Zita Perczel (26 April 1918 – 4 April 1996) was a Hungarian actress.

Filmography

Archive footage
 A Jávor (1987)

Bibliography
 Burns, Bryan. World Cinema: Hungary. Fairleigh Dickinson University Press, 1996.

External links

1918 births
1996 deaths
Hungarian film actresses
Hungarian stage actresses
Hungarian television actresses
Actresses from Budapest
20th-century Hungarian actresses